The International Society for Labour and Social Security Law is an international association whose purpose is to study labour and social security law at the national and international level, to promote the exchange of ideas and information from a comparative perspective, and to encourage collaboration among academics, lawyers, and other experts within the fields of labour and social security law.

Founded in 1958, the ISLSSL is composed of national affiliates whose members are scholars, union and management lawyers, judges, government officials, arbitrators, industrial relations and human resources specialists, and others interested in promoting international exchange of ideas and information and in developing collaboration among experts in the fields of labor, employment and employee benefits law.

The current members of the Executive Committee are Steven L. Willborn (Chair), George Nicolau, Vice-Chair, and Alvin L. Goldman, Secretary-Treasurer.

For many of those active in issues in the workplace, the internationalization of labor law and relations is becoming a reality.  To highlight just a few areas in this field of growing attention to the global legal landscape, those in academia work on issues of comparative labor and employment law, union lawyers consider international aspects of comprehensive corporate campaigns in support of the objectives of their clients, and management attorneys are increasingly called upon to give advice on the international ramifications of the employment policies of their employer clients.

World Congress
The ISLSSL conducts a World Congress every three years and Regional Congresses (open to registrants from all regions) during the interim years. These meetings allow members both to combine travel with expanded understanding of how labor and employment law operate elsewhere and explain their system to others. ISLSSL conferences also facilitate development of new personal contacts and promote important scholarship, education and training in the fields of comparative and international labor law, employment law, and related fields. 

In recent years, ISLSSL World Congresses were convened in Jerusalem in 2000, in Montevideo in 2003, in Paris in 2006, in Sydney, Australia in 2009 and in Santiago, Chile in 2012. A World Congress will be hosted in Cape Town, South Africa in 2015.

Regional branches
The ISLSSL maintains several regional branches. Recent Western Hemisphere Regional Congresses have been held in Lima, Peru; Querétaro, Mexico; and in the Dominican Republic. Recent Asian Regional Congresses were hosted in Manilla and Taipai, and recent European Regional Congresses were held in Stockholm, Bologna, Sevilla (2011) and Dublin (2014). In addition, the U.S. Branch sponsored a one day conferences in Chicago in May 2005 and in Philadelphia in 2012.

Publications
The U.S. Branch of the ISLSSL and the University of Illinois College of Law publish The Comparative Labor Law and Policy Journal, a quarterly law journal which publishes articles in the field of comparative and transnational labor and employment law. The journal publishes comparative analysis articles on labor law, employment policy, labor economics, worker migration, and social security issues. Many articles focus on legal systems in developing countries or post-colonial nations with emerging or new legal systems. The target audience for the journal is academics, practicing attorneys, policy makers, students, workers and labor movement officials and activists. The journal's stated policy is to make the publication readable and of practical value to officials in developing countries.

Notes

See also
 Labor law
 Collective bargaining
 Contingent work
 Industrial relations
 Legal working age
 Child Labour
 Labour movement
 Master and Servant Act
 Right-to-work law
 Social security
 Sweat shops
 Unfair labor practice
 Union Organizer
 Vicarious liability
 Workplace Fairness

External links
 Official site
 Website of the U.S. branch

Labour law
Social law
Labor relations organizations
Organizations established in 1958